David Rodney Orbell (born 27 February 1963) is an Australian former swimmer who competed in the 1984 Summer Olympics in Los Angeles.  Orbell finished sixth in the final of the 200-metre backstroke, and first in the B Final (ninth overall) in the 100-metre backstroke.

See also
 List of Commonwealth Games medallists in swimming (men)

References

1963 births
Living people
Australian male backstroke swimmers
Olympic swimmers of Australia
Swimmers at the 1984 Summer Olympics
Commonwealth Games medallists in swimming
Commonwealth Games gold medallists for Australia
Commonwealth Games silver medallists for Australia
Swimmers at the 1982 Commonwealth Games
20th-century Australian people
Medallists at the 1982 Commonwealth Games